Chelmsford Nature Reserve, also known as Chelmsford Dam Nature Reserve is a nature reserve administered by Ezemvelo KZN Wildlife. The reserve was gazetted on 31 July 1975.

Wildlife
Wildlife includes springbok, oribi, blesbok and red hartebeest. Numerous bird species occur, including the great crested grebe, knob-billed duck, pink-billed lark, black-bellied bustard, African grass-owl and bigger birds like the yellow-billed duck, greater flamingo, lesser flamingo, whiskered tern, osprey and a few fish eagle.

Ntshingwayo Dam
Ntshingwayo Dam (formerly Chelmsford Dam) is the third largest in the province.

Activities
Activities include windsurfing, canoeing and jet skiing.

See also
 Protected areas of South Africa

References

External links

Protected areas of KwaZulu-Natal